Champia is a genus of red algae in the family Champiaceae, first described in 1809 by Nicaise Auguste Desvaux

The genus name of Champia is in honour of the French physician and naturalist Louis Auguste Deschamps (1765–1842).

Species
There are a number of accepted species:
Champia affinis (J.D.Hooker & Harvey) Harvey
Champia bibendum  Huisman
Champia bifida  Okamura
Champia caespitosa  E.Y.Dawson
Champia chathamensis  V.J.Chapman & Dromgoole
Champia compressa  Harvey
Champia disticha  E.Y.Dawson
Champia echigoensis  Noda
Champia expansa  Yendo
Champia farlowii  M.K.Griffith, C.W.Schneider & C.E.Lane
Champia feldmannii  Díaz-Piferrer
Champia gigantea  M.J.Wynne
Champia globulifera  Børgesen
Champia harveyana  D.L.Ballantine & C.Lozada-Troche 
Champia hasselbringii  C.W.Schneider & G.W.Saunders
Champia indica  Børgesen
Champia inkyui  Y.H.Koh, G.Y.Cho & M.S.Kim
Champia insignis  A.H.S.Lucas
Champia insularis  C.W.Schneider & G.W.Saunders
Champia irregularis (Zanardini) Piccone
Champia japonica  Okamura
Champia kotschyana  Endlicher & Diesing
Champia laingii <small> Lindauer]] </small>Champia lubrica  Mas.Suzuki & YoshizakiChampia lumbricalis  (Linnaeus) Desvaux - typeChampia minuscula  A.B.Joly & UgadimChampia novae-zelandiae  (J.D.Hooker & Harvey) HarveyChampia parvula  (C.Agardh) HarveyChampia patula  Huisman & G.W.SaundersChampia plumosa  P.AnandChampia pseudoparvula  Huisman & G.W.SaundersChampia puertoricensis  Lozada-Troche & D.L.BallantineChampia recta  NodaChampia salicornioides  HarveyChampia somalensis  HauckChampia spathulata  Weber BosseChampia stipitata  HuismanChampia subcompressa  HuismanChampia taironensis  Bula-MeyerChampia tripinnata  ZanardiniChampia vieillardii  Kützing Champia viridis  C.AgardhChampia womersleyi  A.J.K.MillarChampia zonata (J.Agardh) J.Agardh Champia zostericola'' (Harvey) Reedman & Womersley

References

External links
Champia occurrence data and images from GBIF

Rhodymeniales
Red algae genera